Dime Box High School or Dime Box School is a public high school located in Dime Box, Texas (USA) and classified as a 1A school by the UIL.  It is part of the Dime Box Independent School District located in northeastern Lee County.   In 2015, the school was rated "Met Standard" by the Texas Education Agency.

Athletics
The Dime Box Longhorns compete in these sports:

Baseball
Basketball
Cross Country
Track and Field
Volleyball
Six-Man Football

State Finalists
Girls Basketball - 
1982(1A)

References

External links
Dime Box ISD

Public high schools in Texas
Schools in Lee County, Texas